The Canada Water Act (the Act) is a statute of the Government of Canada. It specifies the framework for cooperation between the provinces and territories of Canada and for the development and use of Canada's water resources.  This includes research, planning and implementation of programs relating to the conservation of Canadian waterways.

Description
The Act recognizes the increased use and development of Canadian water resources and the connection between Canada's water resources and the health, well-being, and prosperity of Canadians.

The Act received Royal Assent on September 30, 1970.

References

External links
 Canada Water Act at the Department of Justice Canada
 Water and the Environment: Publications

1970 in the environment
Environmental law in Canada
Water conservation in Canada
1970 in Canadian law
Canadian federal legislation